Nikolai Yurievich Kapustin (born 3 October 1957) is a Russian mathematician, Professor, Dr. Sc., a professor at the Faculty of Computer Science at the Moscow State University.

He defended the thesis "Problems for parabolic-hyperbolic equations and corresponding spectral questions with a parameter at boundary points" for the degree of Doctor of Physical and Mathematical Sciences in 2012 and is the author of 3 books and more than 90 scientific articles.

References

Bibliography

External links
 MSU CMC
 Scientific works of Nikolai Kapustin
 Scientific works of Nikolai Kapustin

Russian computer scientists
Russian mathematicians
Living people
1957 births
Academic staff of Moscow State University
Moscow State University alumni